Berean Academy  is a private Christian school in Elbing, Kansas, United States, and serves students of grades K to 12.

History
Berean Academy was founded in 1946. It began with fifteen students in grades nine and ten, but quickly expanded to include grades nine through twelve.

The academy was established as a Mennonite school, but in 1966 it dropped its Mennonite affiliation to become an interdenominational Christian school.

By the 1970s, Berean Academy's enrollment was 300 students. Today, Berean Academy includes grades K-12 and has an enrollment of about 336 students.

Chapel
Elementary students meet weekly for chapel. The school has guest speakers from area churches and communities are invited to make presentations to the students. Many missionaries on furlough share at elementary chapel as well as former students, pastors, and parents.

Junior and senior high students meets twice weekly for chapel.  Administrators and faculty take turns sharing in chapel. The school brings in outside speakers which include community pastors and youth pastors, missionaries, and college representatives.  Student ministry teams lead worship frequently and summer missions reports are given by students.

Athletics
Berean Academy is classified as a 2A school and is a full member of the Kansas State High School Activities Association. The school participate in the Heart of America League.

Junior High Boys
 Basketball
 Soccer
 Track & Field
 Cross country
 Clay Target Club

Junior High Girls
 Basketball
 Track & Field
 Volleyball
 Cross country
 Clay Target Club

High School Boys
 Basketball
 Cross country
 Soccer
 Track & Field
 Golf
 Clay Target Club

High School Girls
 Basketball
 Cross country
 Track and Field
 Volleyball
 Golf
 Clay Target Club

Notable alumni
 John Janzen, Professor Emeritus in the Department of Anthropology at the University of Kansas.

See also
 List of high schools in Kansas
 List of unified school districts in Kansas

References

External links
 Official school website
 Elbing city map, KDOT

Christian schools in Kansas
Private high schools in Kansas
Schools in Butler County, Kansas
Private middle schools in Kansas
Private elementary schools in Kansas
1946 establishments in Kansas